Stan Smith and Dick Stockton were the defending champions, but Stockton did not participate this year. Smith partnered Pat Dupre, losing in the quarterfinals.

Wojtek Fibak and Tom Okker won the title after defeating José Luis Clerc and Ilie Nastase in the final, 6–3, 6–2.

Seeds

Draw

References
 Main Draw

1980 Grand Prix (tennis)